The High Court of Andhra Pradesh is the High Court of the Indian state of Andhra Pradesh. The seat of the High Court is currently located at Nelapadu.

History 

The High Court of Andhra Pradesh was established in the year 1954 when the state was formed from the earlier Madras Presidency. After the merger of the Hyderabad State with Andhra State to form the State of Andhra Pradesh, the Court initially continued at Guntur till 1956. Thereafter the High Court started functioning from the then capital city of state, Hyderabad. However, post bifurcation of Andhra Pradesh, as per the Andhra Pradesh Reorganisation Act, 2014, the High Court of Judicature at Hyderabad was constituted as a common High Court, until the new High Court for the State of Andhra Pradesh is created. Later by a Presidential order, the High Court for the state of Andhra Pradesh was established on 1 January 2019 under the Andhra Pradesh Reorganisation Act, 2014.

Geography and structure 
The High Court is located at  Amaravati. It is a G+2 structure which has 23 halls that spread over an area of 2.2 lakh sqft. It was built in 4 acres with a cost of 157.3 crore. This building was constructed by Larsen & Toubro Limited.

The Judges 

The Andhra Pradesh High Court sits at Amravati, the capital of the state of Andhra Pradesh, and can have maximum of 37 judges, of which 28 must be permanently appointed and 9 may be additionally appointed. The court currently has 30 judges.

Permanent judges

Additional judges

List of chief justices

Current judges 

The Central government has notified the constitution of a new High Court for the state of Andhra Pradesh effective from 1 January 2019, with the principal seat at Amaravati.

The court has a Sanctioned strength of 37 (permanent:28, additional:9) judges.

Judges elevated to the Supreme Court of India-

Judges transferred from the Andhra Pradesh High Court-

References 

 
Government of Andhra Pradesh
2019 establishments in Andhra Pradesh
Courts and tribunals established in 2019